The gwyniad (Coregonus pennantii) is a freshwater whitefish native to Bala Lake in northern Wales.

The population is threatened by deteriorating water quality and by the ruffe, a fish introduced to the lake in the 1980s and now eating the eggs and fry of gwyniad. As a conservation measure, eggs of gwyniad were transferred to Llyn Arenig Fawr, a nearby reservoir, between 2003 and 2007.

The taxonomy of the genus Coregonus is disputed; some authorities assign the gwyniad to the common whitefish (Coregonus lavaretus), and a morphological review in 2012 was unable to find any solid evidence for recognizing the gwyniad as a separate species. FishBase and the IUCN list it as a distinct species, C. pennantii.

See also
Powan
Schelly
Vendace

References

External links
Coregonus pennantii. Integrated Taxonomic Information System (ITIS).

Coregonus
Endemic fauna of Wales
Fish described in 1848